David Mounard (born 27 October 1980) is a French footballer who plays for Ariano Irpino.

Mounard was signed by Mons of Belgian First Division in 2003. In 2004, he left the relegated Mons for Foggia at Italian Serie C1.

In the summer 2008, he was signed by Gallipoli, with whom he also played at Serie B level. In August 2010, he was signed by Siena, but played only a spare league game before joining Benevento on loan during the winter 2011 transfer window. He joined Serie D club Salerno, founded earlier that year as direct heir of excluded local club Salernitana.

Honours
Lega Pro Prima Divisione: 2009

References

External links

French footballers
French expatriate footballers
R.A.E.C. Mons players
Calcio Foggia 1920 players
A.S.D. Gallipoli Football 1909 players
A.C.N. Siena 1904 players
Benevento Calcio players
Belgian Pro League players
Serie B players
Serie C players
Expatriate footballers in Belgium
Expatriate footballers in Italy
Association football midfielders
People from Chantilly, Oise
1980 births
Living people
Sportspeople from Oise
U.S. Agropoli 1921 players
Footballers from Hauts-de-France
French expatriate sportspeople in Belgium
French expatriate sportspeople in Italy